The Rite of Spring is a 2014 studio album by American jazz trio The Bad Plus. It is the group's ninth studio album. It is an interpretation of the Igor Stravinsky orchestral composition.

The trio first performed the music live in 2011.

Reception
Will Layman of PopMatters wrote, "This version is not the usual "jazz version" of a classical composition. Usually, the jazz/classical combination means that melodies and harmonies from classical work are used as the written "song" for a standard jazz performance, with the lead instruments improvising new choruses over the "song structure" of the classical piece... Still, this is in every respect a jazz record." 
Chris Barton of Los Angeles Times mentioned, "The Bad Plus mostly set aside improvisation in an effort to capture Stravinsky’s modernist vision, but in some ways it’s never sounded freer." 
Jason Greene of Pitchfork wrote, "The feat is still impressive, in an athletic way. The trio have been mapping out this version in concert for years, and you could never accuse them of scaling this mountain without planning ahead of time.  But the Rite should elicit gasps, not cock eyebrows—the latter of which is the most extreme reaction the Bad Plus manage to provoke. It's ironic that after tackling (and matching) Black Sabbath and Nirvana, it would be Stravinsky that would finally make the Bad Plus sound positively tame."
Zachary Woolfe wrote in The New York Times, "a suavely hallucinatory Coltrane/Coleman flavor ... confident playing that makes for fun listening ... for sheer strangeness and shock, Stravinsky’s original keeps outdoing its descendants."

Track listing 
First Part: Adoration of the Earth

Second Part: The Sacrifice

Personnel 

The Bad Plus
Reid Anderson – bass, electronics
Ethan Iverson – piano
David King – drums

Technical personnel
Darryl Pitt – executive producer
Pete Rende – engineering, mixing
Huntley Miller – mastering
Chris Hinderaker – production coordination
David King – artwork
Greg Meyers – design
Jay Fram – photography

References

External links 
"The Bad Plus: The Rite of Spring". Jazz Review by Lloyd Sachs.

The Bad Plus albums
2014 albums